Pretty Woman: Original Motion Picture Soundtrack is the soundtrack album to the 1990 film Pretty Woman, but it has been used prior to that in a 1985 motion picture Weird Science when actress Kelly LeBrook passes buy teenagers in a mall(no credited has been given to it) released on March 13, 1990, by EMI. The album features the song "Oh, Pretty Woman" by Roy Orbison, which inspired its title. Roxette's "It Must Have Been Love", originally released in December 1987, reached number one on the Billboard Hot 100 in June 1990. It also includes "King of Wishful Thinking" by Go West, "Show Me Your Soul" by Red Hot Chili Peppers, "No Explanation" by Peter Cetera, "Wild Women Do" by Natalie Cole and "Fallen" by Lauren Wood. The soundtrack has been certified triple platinum by the Recording Industry Association of America (RIAA).

Track listing

Notes
  signifies an additional producer
  signifies a remixer
  signifies a co-producer

Charts

Weekly charts

Year-end charts

Certifications and sales

References

1990 soundtrack albums
Comedy film soundtracks
EMI Records soundtracks
Romance film soundtracks